The 1970–71 NBA season was the Detroit Pistons' 23rd season in the NBA and 14th season in the city of Detroit.  The team played at Cobo Arena in downtown Detroit.  

The Pistons finished with a 45-37 (.549) record, 4th place in the deep Midwest Division, as the NBA re-organized from 2 to 4 divisions.  It was the first winning season for Detroit since the franchise relocated from Ft. Wayne in 1957.  The team was led by guards Dave Bing (27.0 ppg, 5.0 apg, NBA All-Star) and Jimmy Walker (17.6 ppg) and rookie center Bob Lanier (15.6 ppg, 8.1 rpg, All-Rookie Team), who was the top pick in the 1970 NBA Draft.

Draft picks

Roster

Regular season

Season standings

z, y – division champions
x – clinched playoff spot

Record vs. opponents

Game log

Awards and records
Dave Bing, All-NBA First Team
Bob Lanier, NBA All-Rookie Team 1st Team

References

Detroit
Detroit Pistons seasons
Detroit Pistons
Detroit Pistons